Rahim Çota is a member of the Assembly of the Republic of Albania for the Democratic Party of Albania.

References

Living people
Democratic Party of Albania politicians
Members of the Parliament of Albania
Year of birth missing (living people)